The Portland LumberJax are a lacrosse team based in Portland, Oregon playing in the National Lacrosse League (NLL). The 2008 season was the 3rd in franchise history.

After a disappointing 1-5 start and a mediocre 6-10 season, the LumberJax caught fire in the playoffs, defeating both San Jose and Calgary in their own buildings to advance to their first ever NLL Championship game in only their third season. The Jax put up a good fight, but the Buffalo Bandits defeated the Jax 14–13 to win the Champion's Cup.

Regular season

Conference standings

Game log
Reference:

Playoffs

Game log
Reference:

Player stats
Reference:

Runners (Top 10)

Note: GP = Games played; G = Goals; A = Assists; Pts = Points; LB = Loose balls; PIM = Penalty minutes

Goaltenders
Note: GP = Games played; MIN = Minutes; W = Wins; L = Losses; GA = Goals against; Sv% = Save percentage; GAA = Goals against average

Awards

Transactions

Trades

Roster
Reference:

See also
2008 NLL season

References

Portland
2008 in sports in Oregon